Penokee is an unincorporated community located in the township of Morse, Ashland County, Wisconsin, United States. Penokee no longer exists but the old town used to be located south of County Highway GG a few yards west of the railway at the Penokee Gap. It was marked on local property maps through 1992, and is still marked on Wisconsin Department of Transportation maps.

References

Unincorporated communities in Ashland County, Wisconsin
Unincorporated communities in Wisconsin